Tapena is a genus of butterflies in the family Hesperiidae subfamily Pyrginae.

Species
Recognised species in the genus Tapena include:
Tapena bornea Evans, 1941 - Malaysia
Tapena minuscula Elwes and Edwards, 1897 - Myanmar
Tapena multiguttata de Nicéville, 1890 - Myanmar, Thailand
Tapena thwaitesi (Moore, 1881) - Indo-China, Indonesia
Tapena vasava  (Moore, [1866])  - northern India, Sikkim, Myanmar, Thailand, Laos, Vietnam and western China

References

Tagiadini
Butterflies of Asia
Butterflies of Singapore
Butterflies of Indochina
Taxa named by Frederic Moore
Hesperiidae genera